The City of Manchester and its surrounding area has a strong heritage for television broadcasting. The city is home to the oldest television studios in the UK and the most successful ITV franchisee, Granada Television. Manchester's most famous television exports include Coronation Street, Seven Up!, Songs of Praise, University Challenge, Question of Sport and Mastermind - all of which are still broadcasting to large audiences today. Granada's productions gradually waned in the 2000s, but it is hoped the BBC move to Salford Quays in 2011 will spawn a new era of television broadcasting in the area. Manchester also has a high correlation of successful television drama series, with many being produced and filmed in Manchester and the surrounding areas.

Television broadcasting in Manchester is currently undergoing a major transition with the famous Granada Studios and New Broadcasting House being demolished by 2013 to be replaced by MediaCityUK and The Sharp Project. Both the BBC and ITV have promised to invest more in the North and Manchester will be the base for these operations. MediaCityUK, located two miles from Manchester City Centre, will act as a new second home for the BBC and ITV away from London.

This is a list of television programmes that are/were either set, produced or filmed in Manchester. The Media in Manchester page provides a more in depth look at the history of broadcasting and media in Manchester.

Background
The city has had a long heritage of producing programmes at various studios, most notably at ITV's Granada Studios and the BBC's New Broadcasting House. Dock10 studios is located in MediaCityUK, Salford Quays, a couple of miles (about three kilometres) outside Manchester city centre. The Studios at Dock10 is now home to BBC North and ITV Granada since 2013, along with other departments transferred north.

Most television programmes produced in Manchester have been done so by Granada Television, the most successful ITV franchisee who are based at Granada Studios in Manchester. The BBC through BBC North also have a key influence in Manchester and the corporation sees Manchester along with Bristol and London as its main broadcasting centres.

Productions in Manchester
Manchester has two main production units in Granada Television at Granada Studios and BBC Manchester at New Broadcasting House and both share a joint venture in 3SixtyMedia. Smaller Manchester based production companies such as Red Production Company and more recently RSJ Films led by writer Jimmy McGovern have consistently used Manchester and north as a background for drama.

Manchester has been used as a setting for many TV programmes with its industrial past, quirky cultural modern atmosphere or working roots. Some programmes are set in Manchester but weren't filmed or produced there, as in the case of Father & Son, a 2010 drama which was broadcast on ITV.

Awards given to Manchester produced or filmed programmes

BAFTAs 
Since the introduction of the best drama series at the BAFTAs in 1992,  Mancunian produced or filmed drama has won the award on 9 occasions out of the 19 awarded (up to 2011) - more than any other city. Cracker (Granada Television) won twice in 1995 and 1996, The Cops (filmed in Manchester) won twice in 1999 and 2000, Clocking Off (Red Production Company, Manchester production company based at Granada) in 2001, Cold Feet (Granada Television) in 2002, Shameless (filmed in Manchester) in 2005 and The Street (Granada Television) in 2007 and 2008.

Peggy Ashcroft won a BAFTA TV award for best actress in 1985 in her performance in The Jewel In The Crown and later Helen Mirren won best actress three consecutive times, a record, for her performance in the Granada-produced Prime Suspect series.

See also 
 List of films set in Manchester
 List of national radio programmes made in Manchester

References 

Manchester
Television shows set in Manchester